St. Patrick was a provincial electoral district in Ontario, Canada, that was established in 1926 out of the district of Toronto Northeast. It lasted until 1967 when it was merged with St. Andrew to form St. Andrew—St. Patrick.

St. Patrick riding took its name from the former "St. Patrick's ward" of the City of Toronto.

Boundaries
It was created after a major riding redistribution in 1926. Its boundaries consisted of Spadina Avenue on the west from Toronto Harbour north to the city limits just north of St. Clair Avenue. On the east the boundary followed Simcoe Street north from the harbour to Queen Street West. After a short jog east to University Avenue it followed that street north through Queen's Park Crescent and then continued north on Avenue Road through to the city limits just north of St. Clair Avenue West.

Members of Provincial Parliament

Election results

1926 boundaries

1934 boundaries

References

Notes

Citations

Former provincial electoral districts of Ontario
Provincial electoral districts of Toronto